A list of the monuments and the memorials at the Mount Herzl national cemetery and the Yad Vashem Holocaust memorial in Jerusalem.

The Garden of the Missing in Action is a memorial garden with memorial board and memory stones. It is planned that the National Memorial Hall will be built at the entrance to the cemetery.

Monuments and Memorials in Yad Vashem

External links 

 Find a grave on Mount Herzl
 Simulation of the National Memorial Hall on YNET website
 the memorial of Terror Victims in "la'ad" website
 Stamp commemorating the opening of the Garden of the Missing Soldiers by the Israel Postal Company
 Israeli Soldiers "Missing in Action"

Mount Herzl

Military monuments and memorials in Israel
Cemeteries in Jerusalem
Mount Herzl
World War II memorials in Israel
Israel